The 2017–18 Toronto Raptors season was the 23rd season of the franchise in the National Basketball Association (NBA).

On June 28, 2017, the Raptors promoted assistant general manager Bobby Webster to general manager, while Masai Ujiri remained team president. Webster's promotion came over a month after their previous general manager, Jeff Weltman, left the Raptors to become the President of Basketball Operations for the Orlando Magic, with the Raptors acquiring a second-round pick in 2018 in order for them to release Weltman early. However they would later trade that selection, their first round pick, and DeMarre Carroll to the Brooklyn Nets for the rights to Justin Hamilton.

On April 6, 2018, the Raptors set new franchise records for total wins in a season with 57, home wins in a season with 33, and clinched the 1st seed in the Eastern Conference for the first time in franchise history. They would end the season with a record 59 wins and 34 home wins. They would end up winning their 4th division title in 5 years.

In the playoffs, the Raptors faced the eighth seeded Washington Wizards in the first round, winning in six games. They advanced to the semifinals where they faced the Cleveland Cavaliers once again, the team that had eliminated them in the past two NBA playoffs. Just like last season, the Raptors were swept in four games by the Cavaliers. It is also the third time in four seasons that the Raptors were swept in the playoffs, having been swept by the Washington Wizards in the first round of the 2015 Playoffs. They have now lost 10 straight playoff games to the Cavaliers. This sweep marked the 1st time the top seeded conference team was swept in a playoff series since 2015, where the Atlanta Hawks were also swept by the Cleveland Cavaliers in the Conference Finals. The Raptors also became the first top-seeded conference team since the Oklahoma City Thunder in 2013 to have not advanced to the Conference Finals, and the first in NBA history to get swept in the Semifinals.

Following yet another disappointing playoff appearance, head coach Dwane Casey was fired on May 11,
2018.

Offseason

Draft

Roster

<noinclude>

Standings

Division

Conference

Record vs opponents

(* game decided in overtime)

Game log

Preseason

|- style="background:#cfc;"
| 1
| October 1
| LA Clippers
| 
| Kyle Lowry (17)
| Jonas Valančiūnas (10)
| 3 players (4)
| Stan Sheriff Center8,018
| 1–0
|- style="background:#fcc;"
| 2
| October 4
| @ LA Clippers
| 
| DeMar DeRozan (15)
| Jonas Valančiūnas (6)
| DeMar DeRozan (4)
| Stan Sheriff Center8,272
| 1–1
|- style="background:#fcc;"
| 3
| October 5
| @ Portland
| 
| Kyle Lowry (23)
| Alfonzo McKinnie (8)
| Kyle Lowry (6)
| Moda Center15,505
| 1–2
|- style="background:#cfc;"
| 4
| October 10
| Detroit
| 
| C. J. Miles (19)
| Jonas Valančiūnas (11)
| DeMar DeRozan (8)
| Air Canada Centre16,893
| 2–2
|- style="background:#cfc;"
| 5
| October 13
| @ Chicago
| 
| C. J. Miles (27)
| Jonas Valančiūnas (10)
| Kyle Lowry (6)
| United Center19,677
| 3–2

Regular season

|- style="background:#cfc
| 1
| October 19
| Chicago
| 
| Jonas Valančiūnas (23)
| Jonas Valančiūnas (15)
| Kyle Lowry (9)
| Air Canada Centre19,800
| 1–0
|- style="background:#cfc
| 2
| October 21
| Philadelphia
| 
| DeMar DeRozan (30)
| Lucas Nogueira (9)
| Kyle Lowry (5)
| Air Canada Centre19,800
| 2–0
|- style="background:#fcc
| 3
| October 23
| @ San Antonio
| 
| DeMar DeRozan (28)
| Jakob Poeltl (12)
| DeRozan, Powell, Wright (4)
| AT&T Center18,418
| 2–1
|- style="background:#fcc
| 4
| October 25
| @ Golden State
| 
| DeMar DeRozan (24)
| Jakob Poeltl (14)
| Kyle Lowry (9)
| Oracle Arena19,596
| 2–2
|- style="background:#cfc
| 5
| October 27
| @ L.A. Lakers
| 
| DeMar DeRozan (23)
| Kyle Lowry (10)
| Kyle Lowry (12)
| Staples Center17,876
| 3–2
|- style="background:#cfc
| 6
| October 30
| @ Portland
| 
| DeMar DeRozan (25)
| Kyle Lowry (10)
| Kyle Lowry (10)
| Moda Center18,505
| 4–2

|- style="background:#fcc
| 7
| November 1
| @ Denver
| 
| Norman Powell (14)
| Pascal Siakam (8)
| Kyle Lowry (4)
| Pepsi Center14,072
| 4–3
|- style="background:#cfc
| 8
| November 3
| @ Utah
| 
| DeMar DeRozan (37)
| Jonas Valančiūnas (8)
| Kyle Lowry (10)
| Vivint Smart Home Arena16,258
| 5–3
|- style="background:#fcc
| 9
| November 5
| Washington
| 
| DeMar DeRozan (26)
| Serge Ibaka (10)
| VanVleet, Wright (4)
| Air Canada Centre19,800
| 5–4
|- style="background:#cfc
| 10
| November 7
| Chicago
| 
| DeMar DeRozan (24)
| Jonas Valančiūnas (10)
| Kyle Lowry (6)
| Air Canada Centre19,800
| 6–4
|- style="background:#cfc
| 11
| November 9
| New Orleans
| 
| DeMar DeRozan (33)
| Jonas Valančiūnas (13)
| DeMar DeRozan (8)
| Air Canada Centre19,800
| 7–4
|- style="background:#fcc
| 12
| November 12
| @ Boston
| 
| DeMar DeRozan (24)
| Lucas Nogueira (7)
| Kyle Lowry (7)
| TD Garden18,624
| 7–5
|- style="background:#cfc
| 13
| November 14
| @ Houston
| 
| DeMar DeRozan (27)
| Jonas Valančiūnas (7)
| Kyle Lowry (10)
| Toyota Center18,055
| 8–5
|- style="background:#cfc
| 14
| November 15
| @ New Orleans
| 
| DeMar DeRozan (25)
| Kyle Lowry (11)
| Kyle Lowry (9)
| Smoothie King Center15,654
| 9–5
|- style="background:#cfc
| 15
| November 17
| New York
| 
| DeRozan, Lowry (22)
| Kyle Lowry (8)
| Kyle Lowry (10)
| Air Canada Centre19,800
| 10–5
|- style="background:#cfc
| 16
| November 19
| Washington
| 
| DeMar DeRozan (33)
| Pascal Siakam (9)
| DeRozan, Lowry (6)
| Air Canada Centre19,800
| 11–5
|- style="background:#fcc
| 17
| November 22
| @ New York
| 
| Kyle Lowry (25)
| Kyle Lowry (10)
| Kyle Lowry (5)
| Madison Square Garden19,812
| 11–6
|- style="background:#fcc
| 18
| November 24
| @ Indiana
| 
| Kyle Lowry (24)
| Kyle Lowry (10)
| Kyle Lowry (8)
| Bankers Life Fieldhouse16,523
| 11–7
|- style="background:#cfc
| 19
| November 25
| @ Atlanta
| 
| Jonas Valančiūnas (16)
| Kyle Lowry (13)
| DeMar DeRozan (8)
| Philips Arena12,278
| 12–7
|- style="background:#cfc
| 20
| November 29
| Charlotte
| 
| Kyle Lowry (36)
| Serge Ibaka (8)
| Fred VanVleet (9)
| Air Canada Centre19,800
| 13–7

|- style="background:#cfc
| 21
| December 1
| Indiana
| 
| DeMar DeRozan (26)
| Serge Ibaka (8)
| Kyle Lowry (8)
| Air Canada Centre19,800
| 14–7
|- style="background:#cfc
| 22
| December 5
| Phoenix
| 
| DeRozan, Lowry (20)
| Jonas Valančiūnas (8)
| Kyle Lowry (10)
| Air Canada Centre19,800
| 15–7
|- style="background:#cfc
| 23
| December 8
| @ Memphis
| 
| DeMar DeRozan (26)
| Jonas Valančiūnas (8)
| Kyle Lowry (8)
| FedEx Forum15,417
| 16–7
|- style="background:#cfc
| 24
| December 10
| @ Sacramento
| 
| DeMar DeRozan (25)
| Kyle Lowry (12)
| DeMar DeRozan (9)
| Golden 1 Center17,583
| 17–7
|- style="background:#fcc
| 25
| December 11
| @ L.A. Clippers
| 
| Jonas Valančiūnas (23)
| Jonas Valančiūnas (15)
| DeMar DeRozan (8)
| Staples Center16,658
| 17–8
|- style="background:#cfc
| 26
| December 13
| @ Phoenix
| 
| DeMar DeRozan (37)
| Serge Ibaka (13)
| Kyle Lowry (7)
| Talking Stick Resort Arena15,517
| 18–8
|- style="background:#cfc
| 27
| December 15
| Brooklyn
| 
| DeMar DeRozan (31)
| Kyle Lowry (10)
| Kyle Lowry (12)
| Air Canada Centre19,800
| 19–8
|- style="background:#cfc
| 28
| December 17
| Sacramento
| 
| DeMar DeRozan (21)
| Jonas Valančiūnas (16)
| Kyle Lowry (7)
| Air Canada Centre19,800
| 20–8
|- style="background:#cfc
| 29
| December 20
| @ Charlotte
| 
| DeMar DeRozan (28)
| Jakob Poeltl (8)
| DeRozan, Lowry (8)
| Spectrum Center15,023
| 21–8
|- style="background:#cfc
| 30
| December 21
| @ Philadelphia
| 
| DeMar DeRozan (45)
| Kyle Lowry (9)
| Lowry, Wright (4)
| Wells Fargo Center20,680
| 22–8
|- style="background:#cfc
| 31
| December 23
| Philadelphia
| 
| DeMar DeRozan (29)
| Anunoby, Ibaka, Valančiūnas (6)
| Kyle Lowry (5)
| Air Canada Centre19,800
| 23–8
|- style="background:#fcc
| 32
| December 26
| @ Dallas
| 
| Kyle Lowry (23)
| Serge Ibaka (12)
| Kyle Lowry (6)
| American Airlines Center20,005
| 23–9
|- style="background:#fcc
| 33
| December 27
| @ Oklahoma City
| 
| Jonas Valančiūnas (16)
| DeRozan, Poeltl (6)
| Kyle Lowry (10)
| Chesapeake Energy Arena18,203
| 23–10
|- style="background:#cfc
| 34
| December 29
| Atlanta
| 
| DeMar DeRozan (25)
| Jonas Valančiūnas (11)
| DeRozan, Lowry (5)
| Air Canada Centre19,800
| 24–10

|- style="background:#cfc
| 35
| January 1
| Milwaukee
| 
| DeMar DeRozan (52)
| Serge Ibaka (8)
| DeMar DeRozan (8)
| Air Canada Centre19,800
| 25–10
|- style="background:#cfc
| 36
| January 3
| @ Chicago
| 
| DeMar DeRozan (35)
| Delon Wright (13)
| DeMar DeRozan (6)
| United Center20,056
| 26–10
|- style="background:#cfc
| 37
| January 5
| @ Milwaukee
| 
| Serge Ibaka (21)
| Jonas Valančiūnas (13)
| Delon Wright (7)
| Bradley Center18,717
| 27–10
|- style="background:#cfc
| 38
| January 8
| @ Brooklyn
| 
| DeMar DeRozan (35)
| Jonas Valančiūnas (13)
| Kyle Lowry (11)
| Barclays Center13,681
| 28–10
|- style="background:#fcc
| 39
| January 9
| Miami
| 
| DeMar DeRozan (25)
| Delon Wright (7)
| DeMar DeRozan (6)
| Air Canada Centre19,800
| 28–11
|- style="background:#cfc
| 40
| January 11
| Cleveland
| 
| Fred VanVleet (22)
| Jonas Valančiūnas (18)
| DeMar DeRozan (8)
| Air Canada Centre19,923
| 29–11
|- style="background:#fcc
| 41
| January 13
| Golden State
| 
| DeMar DeRozan (42)
| Jonas Valančiūnas (9)
| Fred VanVleet (4)
| Air Canada Centre20,078
| 29–12
|- style="background:#fcc
| 42
| January 15
| @ Philadelphia
| 
| DeMar DeRozan (24)
| Jakob Poeltl (8)
| DeMar DeRozan (5)
| Wells Fargo Center20,637
| 29–13
|- style="background:#cfc
| 43
| January 17
| Detroit
| 
| C.J Miles (21)
| Jonas Valančiūnas (16)
| Lowry, DeRozan, Wright (5)
| Air Canada Centre19,800
| 30–13
|- style="background:#cfc
| 44
| January 19
| San Antonio
| 
| Kyle Lowry (24)
| Jonas Valančiūnas (11)
| DeMar DeRozan (6)
| Air Canada Centre19,800
| 31–13
|- style="background:#fcc
| 45
| January 20
| @ Minnesota
| 
| Kyle Lowry (40)
| Delon Wright (6)
| Delon Wright (6)
| Target Center17,828
| 31–14
|- style="background:#cfc
| 46
| January 24
| @ Atlanta
| 
| Fred VanVleet (19)
| Jonas Valančiūnas (13)
| Fred VanVleet (5)
| Philips Arena12,780
| 32–14
|- style="background:#fcc
| 47
| January 26
| Utah
| 
| Jonas Valančiūnas (28)
| Jonas Valančiūnas (14)
| DeMar DeRozan (8)
| Air Canada Centre19,800
| 32–15
|- style="background:#cfc
| 48
| January 28
| L.A. Lakers
| 
| Fred VanVleet (25)
| Kyle Lowry (11)
| DeMar DeRozan (7)
| Air Canada Centre19,800
| 33–15
|- style="background:#cfc
| 49
| January 30
| Minnesota
| 
| DeMar DeRozan (23)
| Jonas Valančiūnas (11)
| Kyle Lowry (9)
| Air Canada Centre19,800
| 34–15

|- style="background:#fcc
| 50
| February 1
| @ Washington
| 
| Kyle Lowry (29)
| Jonas Valančiūnas (6)
| DeMar DeRozan (6)
| Capital One Arena15,599
| 34–16
|- style="background:#cfc
| 51
| February 2
| Portland
| 
| DeMar DeRozan (35)
| Jonas Valančiūnas (8)
| Kyle Lowry (5)
| Air Canada Centre19,800
| 35–16
|- style="background:#cfc
| 52
| February 4
| Memphis
| 
| Delon Wright (15)
| Jonas Valančiūnas (9)
| Fred VanVleet (8)
| Air Canada Centre19,800
| 36–16
|- style="background:#cfc
| 53
| February 6
| Boston
| 
| Kyle Lowry (23)
| Kyle Lowry (8)
| Fred VanVleet (8)
| Air Canada Centre20,017
| 37–16
|- style="background:#cfc
| 54
| February 8
| New York
| 
| Jonas Valančiūnas (18)
| Jonas Valančiūnas (10)
| Siakam, VanVleet (6)
| Air Canada Centre19,800
| 38–16
|- style="background:#cfc
| 55
| February 11
| @ Charlotte
| 
| DeMar DeRozan (25)
| Jonas Valančiūnas (9)
| DeMar DeRozan (8)
| Spectrum Center15,023
| 39–16
|- style="background:#cfc
| 56
| February 13
| Miami
| 
| DeMar DeRozan (27)
| Valančiūnas, Ibaka (10)
| Kyle Lowry (8)
| Air Canada Centre19,800
| 40–16
|- style="background:#cfc
| 57
| February 14
| @ Chicago
| 
| Lowry, Ibaka (20)
| Jonas Valančiūnas (9)
| Kyle Lowry (10)
| United Center21,006
| 41–16
|- align="center"
| colspan="9" style="background:#bbcaff;" | All-Star Break
|- style="background:#fcc
| 58
| February 23
| Milwaukee
| 
| DeMar DeRozan (33)
| DeRozan, Valančiūnas (7)
| Kyle Lowry (8)
| Air Canada Centre20,047
| 41–17
|- style="background:#cfc
| 59
| February 26
| Detroit
| 
| Lowry, DeRozan (20)
| Serge Ibaka (9)
| DeMar DeRozan (7)
| Air Canada Centre19,800
| 42–17
|- style="background:#cfc
| 60
| February 28
| @ Orlando
| 
| DeMar DeRozan (21)
| Jakob Poeltl (8)
| Kyle Lowry (11)
| Amway Center17,328
| 43–17

|- style="background:#cfc
| 61
| March 2
| @ Washington
| 
| DeMar DeRozan (23)
| Kyle Lowry (7)
| Kyle Lowry (5)
| Capital One Arena18,631
| 44–17
|- style="background:#cfc
| 62
| March 4
| Charlotte
| 
| DeMar DeRozan (19)
| Jonas Valančiūnas (13)
| DeMar DeRozan (8)
| Air Canada Centre19,800
| 45–17
|- style="background:#cfc
| 63
| March 6
| Atlanta
| 
| DeMar DeRozan (25)
| Jakob Poeltl (9)
| VanVleet, Lowry (7)
| Air Canada Centre19,800
| 46–17
|- style="background:#cfc
| 64
| March 7
| @ Detroit
| 
| DeMar DeRozan (42)
| Jonas Valančiūnas (11)
| Kyle Lowry (15)
| Little Caesars Arena17,769
| 47–17
|- style="background:#cfc
| 65
| March 9
| Houston
| 
| Kyle Lowry (30)
| Jonas Valančiūnas (10)
| Kyle Lowry (6)
| Air Canada Centre20,131
| 48–17
|- style="background:#cfc
| 66
| March 11
| @ New York
| 
| Jonas Valančiūnas (17)
| Jonas Valančiūnas (9)
| Kyle Lowry (7)
| Madison Square Garden19,812
| 49–17
|- style="background:#cfc
| 67
| March 13
| @ Brooklyn
| 
| Jonas Valančiūnas (26)
| Jonas Valančiūnas (14)
| Kyle Lowry (11)
| Barclays Center16,654
| 50–17
|- style="background:#cfc
| 68
| March 15
| @ Indiana
| 
| DeMar DeRozan (24)
| Jonas Valančiūnas (17)
| DeMar DeRozan (7)
| Bankers Life Fieldhouse17,923
| 51–17
|- style="background:#cfc
| 69
| March 16
| Dallas
| 
| DeMar DeRozan (29)
| Jonas Valančiūnas (12)
| Fred VanVleet (8)
| Air Canada Centre19,800
| 52–17
|- style="background:#fcc
| 70
| March 18
| Oklahoma City
| 
| DeMar DeRozan (24)
| Serge Ibaka (6)
| Kyle Lowry (10)
| Air Canada Centre19,800
| 52–18
|- style="background:#cfc
| 71
| March 20
| @ Orlando
| 
| Kyle Lowry (25)
| Jonas Valančiūnas (8)
| Kyle Lowry (8)
| Amway Center16,228
| 53–18
|- style="background:#fcc
| 72
| March 21
| @ Cleveland
| 
| Kyle Lowry (24)
| Poeltl, Valančiūnas (8)
| Kyle Lowry (7)
| Quicken Loans Arena20,562
| 53–19
|- style="background:#cfc
| 73
| March 23
| Brooklyn
| 
| Kyle Lowry (25)
| Kyle Lowry (10)
| Kyle Lowry (12)
| Air Canada Centre19,800
| 54–19
|- style="background:#fcc
| 74
| March 25
| L.A. Clippers
| 
| Valančiūnas, VanVleet (16)
| Jonas Valančiūnas (16)
| Kyle Lowry (8)
| Air Canada Centre19,800
| 54–20
|- style="background:#cfc
| 75
| March 27
| Denver
| 
| DeRozan, Valančiūnas, VanVleet (15)
| Jakob Poeltl (8)
| DeRozan, Lowry (8)
| Air Canada Centre19,800
| 55–20
|- style="background:#fcc
| 76
| March 31
| @ Boston
| 
| DeMar DeRozan (32)
| Ibaka, Valančiūnas (10)
| Kyle Lowry (9)
| TD Garden18,624
| 55–21

|- style="background:#fcc
| 77
| April 3
| @ Cleveland
| 
| DeMar DeRozan (19)
| Serge Ibaka (12)
| DeMar DeRozan (7)
| Quicken Loans Arena20,562
| 55–22
|- style="background:#cfc
| 78
| April 4
| Boston
| 
| DeMar DeRozan (16)
| Delon Wright (9)
| Kyle Lowry (5)
| Air Canada Centre19,963
| 56–22
|- style="background:#cfc
| 79
| April 6
| Indiana
| 
| Serge Ibaka (25)
| Jonas Valančiūnas (12)
| Kyle Lowry (9)
| Air Canada Centre19,924
| 57–22
|- style="background:#cfc
| 80
| April 8
| Orlando
| 
| C.J. Miles (22)
| Pascal Siakam (9)
| Kyle Lowry (7)
| Air Canada Centre19,948
| 58–22
|- style="background:#cfc
| 81
| April 9
| @ Detroit
| 
| Jonas Valančiūnas (25)
| Jonas Valančiūnas (9)
| Kyle Lowry (9)
| Little Caesars Arena17,529
| 59–22
|- style="background:#fcc
| 82
| April 11
| @ Miami
| 
| Kyle Lowry (28)
| Jakob Poeltl (12)
| Kyle Lowry (9)
| American Airlines Arena19,600
| 59–23

Playoffs

|- style="background:#cfc;"
| 1
| April 14
| Washington
| 
| Serge Ibaka (23)
| Serge Ibaka (12)
| Kyle Lowry (9)
| Air Canada Centre19,937
| 1–0
|- style="background:#cfc;"
| 2
| April 17
| Washington
| 
| DeMar DeRozan (37)
| Jonas Valanciunas (14)
| Kyle Lowry (12)
| Air Canada Centre20,242
| 2–0
|- style="background:#fcc;"
| 3
| April 20
| @ Washington
| 
| DeMar DeRozan (23)
| Serge Ibaka (6)
| Kyle Lowry (8)
| Capital One Arena20,356
| 2–1
|- style="background:#fcc;"
| 4
| April 22
| @ Washington
| 
| DeMar DeRozan (35)
| Serge Ibaka (10)
| DeMar DeRozan (6)
| Capital One Arena20,356
| 2–2
|- style="background:#cfc;"
| 5
| April 25
| Washington
| 
| DeMar DeRozan (32)
| Jonas Valanciunas (13)
| Kyle Lowry (10)
| Air Canada Centre19,987
| 3–2
|- style="background:#cfc;"
| 6
| April 27
| @ Washington
| 
| Kyle Lowry (24)
| Jonas Valanciunas (12)
| Kyle Lowry (6)
| Capital One Arena20,356
| 4–2

|- style="background:#fcc;"
| 1
| May 1
| Cleveland
| 
| DeMar DeRozan (22)
| Jonas Valanciunas (21)
| Kyle Lowry (10)
| Air Canada Centre19,954
| 0–1
|- style="background:#fcc;"
| 2
| May 3
| Cleveland
| 
| DeMar DeRozan (24)
| Jonas Valanciunas (12)
| Kyle Lowry (8)
| Air Canada Centre20,127
| 0–2
|- style="background:#fcc;"
| 3
| May 5
| @ Cleveland
| 
| Kyle Lowry (27)
| Jonas Valanciunas (11)
| Kyle Lowry (7)
| Quicken Loans Arena20,562
| 0–3
|- style="background:#fcc;"
| 4
| May 7
| @ Cleveland
| 
| Jonas Valanciunas (18)
| DeRozan, Valanciunas (5)
| Kyle Lowry (10)
| Quicken Loans Arena20,562
| 0–4

Transactions

Free agency

Trades

Re-signed

Additions

Subtractions

References

Toronto Raptors seasons
Toronto Raptors
Toronto Raptors
Toronto Raptors
Tor